Alimi Ballard (born October 17, 1977) is an American television actor. He is best known for his role as FBI agent David Sinclair on the CBS police procedural Numb3rs (2005–2010).

Early life 
Ballard was born in The Bronx, New York and began acting in high school. He attended Mind-Builders Creative Arts Center in the NE Bronx and participated in their PYT theater program.

Career
From 1993 to 1996, Ballard portrayed Frankie Hubbard (son of All My Children supercouple Jesse and Angie) on the ABC daytime soap opera Loving and its successor series The City. In 1997, he was a regular cast member on the short-lived ABC sitcom Arsenio, which starred Arsenio Hall and Vivica A. Fox. He also portrayed Quizmaster Albert on the ABC/WB series Sabrina, the Teenage Witch (1997–99) and Herbal on the Fox series Dark Angel (2000–01).

From 2005 to 2010, Ballard co-starred in the CBS police procedural, Numb3rs, as David Sinclair. In 2011, Ballard guest-starred as Special Agent Gayne Levin on another CBS procedural, NCIS. This guest role reunited him with Michael Weatherly, who previously co-starred with Ballard on three series: Loving, The City, and Dark Angel. From 2012 to 2015, he played a recurring role on CSI: Crime Scene Investigation as Officer Crawford, a newly promoted detective, after appearing in season 3 as a music producer. He also guest starred on NYPD Blue, American Dreams, Rizzoli & Isles, Drop Dead Diva, Castle, and Bones.

In 2015, Ballard was cast opposite Mireille Enos in the ABC legal thriller, The Catch, leaving after the first season.

Personal life
Ballard and his wife Dahn have two children, Zion, born in 2005, and Cairo, born in 2008.

Filmography

Film

Television

Video Games

References

External links
 
 

1977 births
African-American male actors
American male film actors
American male soap opera actors
American male television actors
Entertainers from the Bronx
Living people
Male actors from New York City
21st-century African-American people
20th-century African-American people